Centrarchinae is a subfamily of freshwater ray-finned fish, one of three subfamilies in the family Centrarchidae, the sunfishes.

Genera
The following three genera are classified as being in the subfamily Centrarchinae:

 Ambloplites Rafinesque, 1820
 Archoplites Gill, 1861
 Centrarchus Cuvier, 1829
 Enneacanthus Gill, 1864
 Pomoxis Rafinesque, 1818

References

 
Centrarchidae
Ray-finned fish subfamilies